Wilson is an unincorporated community located in both Garrett County, Maryland and Grant County, West Virginia, United States. The West Virginia side of Wilson once had a post office, which closed on July 16, 1988.

George W. Wilson, an early postmaster, gave the community his name.

References

Unincorporated communities in Garrett County, Maryland
Unincorporated communities in Grant County, West Virginia
Unincorporated communities in Maryland
Unincorporated communities in West Virginia